This is a list of current and former Roman Catholic churches in the Roman Catholic Diocese of San Diego. The diocese comprises Imperial and San Diego Counties in the Southern California and has more than 100 churches. The cathedral of the diocese is St. Joseph Cathedral in the Cortez Hill neighborhood of downtown San Diego.

Imperial County

San Diego County

City of San Diego

East County

North County

South County

References

 
San Diego
churches